Peter John Visser (born 10 May 1960) is a former New Zealand cricketer who played for the Central Districts in the State Championship and in the State Shield in the 1980s. He also played for the Nelson in the Hawke Cup. He was born in Waikari.

References

1960 births
Living people
New Zealand cricketers
Central Districts cricketers
New Zealand people of Dutch descent
People from Waikari
Cricketers from Canterbury, New Zealand